Andrea Domenico Di Liberto (born 19 May 1997) is an Italian sprint canoeist.

He competed at the 2021 ICF Canoe Sprint World Championships, winning a gold medal in the K-1 200 m distance.

References

External links

1997 births
Living people
Italian male canoeists
ICF Canoe Sprint World Championships medalists in kayak
21st-century Italian people